Sin Gwang-suk (born 8 November 1946) is a South Korean fencer. She competed in the women's individual foil event at the 1964 Summer Olympics.

References

1946 births
Living people
South Korean female fencers
Olympic fencers of South Korea
Fencers at the 1964 Summer Olympics
Ewha Womans University alumni
20th-century South Korean women